The China national para ice hockey team (recognized as China), established in 2017, represents the People's Republic of China in international sledge hockey competitions and is governed by the Winter Sports Management Center of the State Sports General Administration of China (国家体育总局冬季运动管理中心).

History 
The national para ice hockey team was established in September, 2017 by the China Disabled Persons' Federation, Qingdao Municipal People's Government, Shandong Disabled Persons' Federation in Qingdao, Shandong province.

Competitive results
In 2022, in China's home winter Paralympics games and the team's first appearance at the games, the national ice sledge hockey team won a historic bronze after defeating South Korea 4–0. It is considered a remarkable achievement, as the ice hockey team was established in 2017 and had achieved huge progress in the past 5 years.

Team members
Bai Xuesong
Cui Yutao
Hu Guangjian
Ji Yanzhao
Li Hongguan
Lyu Zhi
Shen Yifeng
Song Xiaodong
Tian Jintao
Wang Jujiang
Wang Wei 
Wang Zhidong
Xu Jinqiang
Yu Jing (Female)
Zhang Zheng
Zhu Zhanfu

References

Ice sledge hockey
National ice sledge hockey teams